Agrisius albula is a moth of the subfamily Arctiinae. It is found in Myanmar.

References

Moths described in 1997
Lithosiini
Moths of Asia